The 2011 Shandong Luneng Taishan F.C. season involved Shandong competing in the 2011 Chinese Super League, 2011 Chinese FA Cup, 2011 AFC Champions League. The team qualified for the AFC Champions League after winning the 2010 Chinese Super League.

Players

Competitions

Chinese Super League

Chinese FA Cup

AFC Champions League

References

Shandong Taishan F.C. seasons
Shandong Luneng